Boomerang is the collective title for two children's channels that air animated series; Boomerang Africa — a feed for Africa, and Boomerang MENA — a feed for the Middle East, in addition to Greece and Cyprus. Both channels are owned by Warner Bros. Discovery through its International division.

Background 
Boomerang EMEA was launched on March 2005 in the Middle East and Africa in English. On 5 June 2005, the channel expanded to Europe and also offered Polish (partly) and Hungarian audio tracks for Poland and Hungary respectively. In December 2005, a Greek audio track was added on Greek and Cypriot TV providers. On 1 August 2007, the channel began broadcasting from the Astra 1K and Hot Bird 7A satellites in the territories of the CIS and Baltic countries. The channel was partially broadcast in Russian. In 2008, an audio track in Arabic was added, and the channel also began to broadcast fully in Polish. In October 2010, the channel started broadcasting shows in Romanian. In 2010, the channel expanded to Romania, Hungary, Czech Republic, Slovakia, Croatia, Serbia and Montenegro.The African website, BoomerangTVAfrica.com, launched briefly in 2010. However, on 12 October 2011, a dedicated Central and Eastern European feed (serving Poland, Hungary, and Romania) was launched, featuring its schedule with Hungarian, Romanian, Polish, and English audios. Along with the preschool brand, Cartoonito joined both feeds as a morning block. Despite the split, Boomerang EMEA continued to air across until they were all slowly wanned by 2015.

History

As Boomerang (2016–2023) 
On 14 January 2015, the channel adopted the global rebrand and renamed itself as Boomerang Africa. On 1 July 2016, Boomerang MENA – an official feed for the Arab world, launched to replace the African feed on the region's TV providers, as well as in Greece and Cyprus. The HD channel carries a separate schedule and set of censorship rules, with three audio tracks: English, Arabic, and Greek. Boomerang Africa switched to 16:9 widescreen on 21 September 2016. On 4 March 2019, it began broadcasting in HD.

As Cartoonito (2023–present) 

In Africa, Cartoonito was launched as a morning block for the pan-European feed of Boomerang, broadcasting for seven days a week beginning on 12 October 2011. The block ended on 1 January 2014. The Cartoonito block returned to the channel on 4 April 2022, as part of the May 2021 relaunch. On 8 February 2023, it was announced that Cartoonito would expand into a full-time channel in Boomerang's place on 25 March.

Sister channels

Cartoon Network 

Cartoon Network is a television channel offering animation ranging from action to comedy for children aged 7–14.

Boing 

Boing is a television channel that airs repeats of programs formerly seen on Cartoon Network and Boomerang. It launched on 30 May 2015, as the fourth extension of Turner's larger Boing brand.

Toonami 
Toonami is a television channel catered towards young adults consisting of DC animation from Batman, Superman and Young Justice. It launched in 2017 on Kwesé TV until the platform went defunct in 2019. Then it was made available on Cell C's defunct streaming service Black for that same year.

In March 2020, the channel was revived as a 2 month pop-up channel on DStv and GOtv thereafter it was made available full-time on the StarTimes platform after its closure. As of March 2021, Toonami can also be found on Canal+, Intelvision, Azam TV and Zuku TV.

See also 
 Cartoonito
 List of international Cartoon Network channels
 List of programs broadcast by Cartoonito

References

External links 
Official Middle Eastern website
Official African website

Cartoonito
Middle Eastern and Africa
Television channels and stations established in 2016
Television stations in the United Arab Emirates
Television stations in Saudi Arabia
Television stations in Egypt
Television channels in Jordan
Television stations in the State of Palestine
Television stations in Iraq
Television stations in Algeria
Television stations in Libya
Television stations in Lebanon
Television stations in Morocco
Television stations in Kuwait
Television stations in South Africa
Television channels in Greece
Television channels in Cyprus
Television stations in Yemen
Television channels in Syria
Television stations in Kenya
Warner Bros. Discovery EMEA